Mulahi is a small village in Rasulabad, Kanpur Dehat in Uttar Pradesh, India. Mulahi has 4 small sub villages.

Mulahi
Nivada
Karkrapur - Also known as khas gajan
Bachit pura

Education Institutions 
SD International Public School Mulahi
 Primary and junior school in all 4 sub villages available

Population 
Mulahi has a population of 2000.

Temple 
Few temples are in the village as - Brahma Dev, Mata ka mandir
Banipara temple is a famous temple in nearby location.

Villages in Kanpur Dehat district